Todd Lumsden (born 6 February 1978 in Consett) is an English football player and manager.

Career
Lumsden mostly played in the lower leagues of Scottish football, although he did play for Hamilton Academical at First Division level. He was appointed player/manager of Albion Rovers in May 2012, after Paul Martin resigned due to health reasons. Lumsden left Albion Rovers after the 2012–13 season, as the club were relegated from the Second Division. He was succeeded by his assistant James Ward.

On 1 July 2014 Lumsden became assistant manager to Allan Moore at Arbroath
 He became interim manager after Moore left the club in April 2015 and was appointed manager on a two-year deal on 30 April 2015. However, after less than a year with the side, Lumsden was sacked following a run of bad results.

Outside of football, Lumsden is the curriculum manager for sport at Cumbernauld College.

On 5 August 2016, Lumsden become assistant manager at Junior Club Linlithgow Rose F.C.
 He became team manager on 31 October 2016. He was fired on 2 May 2017.

Manager statistics

 statistics at Arbroath include initial spell as caretaker.

Honours and Achievements

Player
Hamilton Academical
Scottish Second Division promotion (1): 2003-04 (third tier)

Raith Rovers
Scottish Second Division (1): 2008-09 (third tier)

Albion Rovers
Scottish Second Division play-offs (2): 2010-11 (promoted to third tier); 2011-12 (prevented relegation to fourth tier)

References

External links
 

1978 births
Albion Rovers F.C. players
Albion Rovers F.C. managers
English footballers
Association football defenders
Living people
Hamilton Academical F.C. players
Sportspeople from Consett
Footballers from County Durham
Scottish Football League players
Oxford United F.C. players
Raith Rovers F.C. players
Stirling Albion F.C. players
English football managers
Scottish Football League managers
Chester-le-Street Town F.C. players
Arbroath F.C. managers
Scottish Professional Football League managers
Rangers F.C. non-playing staff